Frederick William Reeve (1 May 1918 – 1994) was an English professional footballer who played as a wing half.

References

1918 births
1994 deaths
English footballers
Association football wing halves
Ashford United F.C. players
Crystal Palace F.C. players
Tottenham Hotspur F.C. players
Rochdale A.F.C. players
Grimsby Town F.C. players
Reading F.C. players
Hastings United F.C. (1948) players
English Football League players